William Beveridge (1879–1963) was a British economist.

William Beveridge may also refer to:

William Beveridge (bishop) (1637–1708), English Bishop of St Asaph
William Beveridge (footballer) (1858–1941), Scottish footballer and athlete
Bill Beveridge (1909–1995), Canadian ice hockey player
William Blackwood Beveridge (1835–1890), Canadian merchant and political figure
William Ian Beardmore Beveridge (1908–2006), Australian animal pathologist